Eclipse Comics was an American comic book company, active from 1977 to 1994.

Titles

0–9
3-D Alien Terror (1986)
3-D Lars of Mars (April 1987)
3-D Laser Eraser and Pressbutton
3-D Three Stooges (1986–1987)

A
Aces, co-published with Acme Press
Adolescent Radioactive Black Belt Hamsters
Adolescent Radioactive Black Belt Hamsters in 3-D
Adolescent Radioactive Black Belt Hamsters Massacre the Japanese Invasion
Airboy by Chuck Dixon
Airboy Meets the Prowler by Chuck Dixon
Airboy - Mr.Monster special by Chuck Dixon
Airboy versus the Airmaidens by Chuck Dixon
Air Fighters Classics 
Airfighters Meet Sgt. Strike Special
Airmaidens Special
Allan W. Eckert's Tecumseh!
Alex Toth's Zorro
Alien Encounters
Alien Worlds
All Star Index, published by Independent Comics Group, distributed by Eclipse.
Amazing Cynicalman by Matt Feazell
Appleseed
Area 88
Ariane & Bluebeard by P. Craig Russell
Army Surplus Komikz Featuring: Cutey Bunny, published by JQ Enterprises, distributed by Eclipse (issue #5).
Axa 
Axel Pressbutton by Pedro Henry, Steve Dillon, and Brian Bolland
Aztec Ace

B
Back Down the Line
Bedlam
Bernie Wrightson, Master of the Macabre by Bernie Wrightson
Black Magic
Black Terror
Blandman
Blood Is the Harvest
Bob Powell's Timeless Tales
Bogie by Claude-Jean Philippe and Patrick Lesueur
Born to Be Wild
Brian Bolland's Black Book
Brought to Light
Bullet Crow, Fowl of Fortune
Buster Keaton

C
California Girls (1987) by Trina Robbins
Cap'n Quick and a Foozle
Captain EO 3-D
Champions (1986, later taken over as League of Champions by Heroic Publishing), based on the Champions RPG. Not to be confused with the earlier Marvel Comics series of the same name.
Clint by Don Chin and Ken Meyer Jr
Clive Barker: The Life of Death (1993) by Fred Burke, Steve Niles, Stewart Stanyard, and Hector Gomez
Clive Barker: Son of Celluloid (1991) by Steve Niles and Les Edwards
Clive Barker: Revelations (1992) by Steve Niles and Lionel Talaro
Comics Express
The Complete Alec by Eddie Campbell, co-published with Acme Press
The Complete Pogo Comics
Contractors
Coyote
Crossfire by Mark Evanier and Dan Spiegle
Crossfire & Rainbow
Cyber 7

D
Daughters of Fly In My Eye
David Chelsea In Love
Detectives Inc.: A Remembrance of Threatening Green (1980 graphic novel) by Don McGregor and Marshall Rogers
Detectives, Inc.: A Terror of Dying Dreams (1985 graphic novel) by Don McGregor and Gene Colan
Destroy!!
Destroyer Duck by Steve Gerber, Jack Kirby, and Buzz Dixon
Dinosaurs Attack!
Directory to a Non-Existent Universe, published by Independent Comics Group, distributed by Eclipse.
The Dirty Pair: Biohazards by Adam Warren and Toren Smith
The Dirty Pair: Dangerous Acquaintances by Adam Warren and Toren Smith
Dishman
The DNAgents by Mark Evanier and Will Meugniot
Dominion
Downside
Dragon Chiang 
Dragonflight
Dread (1992) by Fred Burke and Dan Brereton, based on the works of Clive Barker.
The Dreamery by Donna Barr, Lela Dowling, and Lex Nakashima

E
Eclipse Magazine
Eclipse Monthly
El Salvador: A House Divided
Elf-Thing
Enchanter
Espers by James Hudnall

F
Farewell to the Gipper by Dan O'Neill
Fashion in Action by John K. Snyder III
Fast Fiction: She by H. Rider Haggard by Dick Davis and Vincent Napoli
Fearbook
Floyd Farland - Citizen of the Future by Chris Ware
Fly In My Eye
Fly In My Eye Exposed
The Foozle
Fun With Reid Fleming (World's Toughest Milkman)
Fusion by Steven Barnes, Lela Dowling, Steve Gallacci, Lex Nakashima, et al.

G
Giant-Size Mini Comics
Groo Special
Guerilla Groundhog

H
Halloween Horror
Hand of Fate
Heartbreak Comics
Hembeck: The Best of Dateline: @!!?# (1979) by Fred Hembeck
The Hobbit by J.R.R. Tolkien, adapted by Charles Dixon with art by David Wenzel
Hotspur

I
I Am Legend (1991)
Illegal Aliens (Sept. 1992)
Iran-Contra Scandal Trading Cards

J
James Bond 007: Licence to Kill (1989), co-published with Acme Press
James Bond 007: Permission to Die (1989-1991), co-published with Acme Press
Jiggs is Back
John Bolton's Halls of Horror
John Law Detective
Johnny Comet by Frank Frazetta
The Johnny Nemo Magazine

K
Kamui
Killer ... Tales by Timothy Truman
Kitz 'n' Katz Komics
Krazy & Ignatz - Reprints of Sunday Krazy Kat strips by George Herriman. This series covered the years 1916 through 1924, and the first Eclipse volume was published in 1988. Nine volumes were released before Eclipse shut down. The series was revived by Fantagraphics in 2002, beginning with strips dating from 1925 and continuing to the end of the Krazy Kat archive in 1944. Fantagraphics then began republishing the earlier Sunday strips in three-year volumes, starting with 1916–1918, as the original Eclipse volumes are rare and out of print.

L
Laser Eraser and Pressbutton
Last Kiss, co-published with Acme Press
The Legend of Kamui
The Liberty Project by Kurt Busiek and James W. Fry
Life in Northwest Nowhere
Loco vs. Pulverine
Lost Continent
Lost Planet
Luger

M
M
Mad Dogs
The Magic Flute by P. Craig Russell
Man of War
Masked Man
Mai, the Psychic Girl
Merchants of Death
Metaphysique
The Mike Mist Minute Mist-Eries
Millennium Index, published by Independent Comics Group, distributed by Eclipse.
Milton Caniff's America
Miracleman by Alan Moore, Neil Gaiman, et al.
Miracleman: Apocrypha
The Miracleman Family
Moderne Man Comics
Modesty Blaise: First American Editions - Reprints of British comic strips of the 1960s and 1980s by Peter O'Donnell, with art by Jim Holdaway and Neville Colvin.
Mr. Monster's Super Duper Special
Ms. Tree by Max Allan Collins and Terry Beatty
Mr. Monster

N
Naive Inter-Dimensional Commando Koalas, published by Independent Comics Group, distributed by Eclipse.
New America
The New DNAgents
The New Wave
The New Wave Vs. the Volunteers
New York: Year Zero
Night Music by P. Craig Russell
Nightmares

O
The Official Crisis On Infinite Earths Crossover Index, published by Independent Comics Group, distributed by Eclipse.
The Official Crisis On Infinite Earths Index, published by Independent Comics Group, distributed by Eclipse.
The Official Hawkman Index, published by Independent Comics Group, distributed by Eclipse.
The Official Justice League Index, published by Independent Comics Group, distributed by Eclipse.
The Official Legion of Super-Heroes Index, published by Independent Comics Group, distributed by Eclipse.
The Official Teen Titans Index, published by Independent Comics Group, distributed by Eclipse.
One Mile Up
Opera
ORBiT
The Original Zot!
Overload Magazine

P
Parts Unknown
P.J. Warlock
Phaze
Pigeons from Hell by Scott Hampton
Point Blank, co-published with Acme Press
Portia Prinz of the Glamazons
Power Comics, co-published with Acme Press
The Price by Jim Starlin (Dreadstar series)
The Prowler
The Prowler in White Zombie

Q

R
R.O.B.O.T. Battalion 2050
Radio Boy by Chuck Dixon, Jim Engel and Flint Henry
Rael: Into the Shadow of the Sun, co-published with Acme Press
Ragamuffins by Don McGregor and Gene Colan
Rawhead Rex (1994) by Steve Niles and Lionel Talaro, based on the works of Clive Barker.
Real Love: The Best of Simon and Kirby Romance Comics: 1940s-1950s
Real War Stories
Reese's Pieces
Reid Fleming, World's Toughest Milkman
Retaliator
The Return of Valkyrie
The Revenge of the Prowler
The Rime of the Ancient Mariner
Robin Hood
The Rocketeer
The Rocketeer Special Edition

S
Sabre: Slow Fade of an Endangered Species (1978 graphic novel) by Don McGregor and Paul Gulacy
Sabre by Don McGregor and Billy Graham
The Sacred and the Profane by Dean Motter and Ken Steacy
Sam Bronx and the Robots by Serge Clerc, co-published with Acme Press
Samurai, Son of Death
Saturday Mourning: Fly In My Eye
The Science Service, co-published with Acme Press
Seduction of the Innocent (1985), #1–6
Scorpio Rose
Scout by Timothy Truman
Scout: The Four Monsters
Scout: Mount Fire
Scout: War Shaman
Scout Handbook
Siegel and Shuster, Dateline 1930s
Silverheels
The Sisterhood of Steel
Skywolf
Somerset Holmes
Spaced
The Spider 
The Spider: Reign of the Vampire King
The Spiral Path
Spittin' Image
Star Reach Classics
Steed and Mrs. Peel, co-published with Acme Press
Stewart the Rat by Steve Gerber, Gene Colan, and Tom Palmer
Stig's Inferno by Ty Templeton
Stormwatcher, co-published with Acme Press
Star*Reach Classics
Stinz: Horsebrush and Other Tales
Straight Up to See The Sky
Strange Days by Peter Milligan, Brendan McCarthy, and Brett Ewins
Strike! by Chuck Dixon
Strike! vs. Sgt. Strike Special
Sun Runners (moved to Sirius Entertainment)
Surge by Mark Evanier, Rick Hoberg, and Al Gordon
Swords of Texas
Swordsmen and Saurians by Roy Krenkel

T
Tales from the Plague
Tales of the Beanworld, published by The Beanworld Press, distributed by Eclipse (issues #5–21).
Tales of the Mysterious Traveler
Tales of Terror
Tapping the Vein (1989–1992) - Anthology series, edited by Fred Burke (and Valerie Jones, Book 5).
Target: Airboy
Teen-Aged Dope Slaves and Reform School Girls
Tips from Top Cartoonists
Toadswart d'Amplestone: A Gothic Tale of Horror and Magick
Tor 3-D
Total Eclipse
Total Eclipse: The Seraphim Objective
Trapped - Dean R. Koontz
True Crime Comics
True Crime Comics Special
True Love
Twisted Tales
The Twisted Tales of Bruce Jones

U
The Unknown Worlds of Frank Brunner

V
Valkyrie!
Valkyrie: Prisoner of the Past
Velocity, co-published with Acme Press
Villains and Vigilantes

W
Walt Kelly's Christmas Classics (1987)
Walt Kelly's Springtime Tales
Weird Romance (1988)
Weasel Patrol
What's Michael?
Whodunnit?
Wilderness Graphic Album
Will Eisner Presents
Winter World by Chuck Dixon and Jorge Zaffino
World of Wood

X
X-Farce
Xanadu Color Special
Xenon
XYR

Y
The Yattering and Jack (1991) by Steve Niles and John Bolton, based on the works of Clive Barker.

Z
Zooniverse
Zorro in Old California
Zot! by Scott McCloud

External links

Eclipse Comics